Antonio Culebras (born 14 September 1950) is a Spanish former freestyle swimmer who competed in the 1972 Summer Olympics.

References

1950 births
Living people
Spanish male freestyle swimmers
Olympic swimmers of Spain
Swimmers at the 1972 Summer Olympics
Swimmers at the 1971 Mediterranean Games
Mediterranean Games gold medalists for Spain
Mediterranean Games medalists in swimming
20th-century Spanish people